Charge was originally produced as a youth television show aimed at showcasing viewer's user-generated content. It was broadcast on the Media Trust's Community Channel on Sky channel 539, Virgin TV channel 233 and Freeview channel 87 in the UK.

After the second series it was decided to expand charge into a separate youth strand on the Community Channel and it ran in this form for two series.

Content

Targeted at 16- to 25-year-olds, the first two series were dedicated to showcasing viewer's originally produced content and featured a mixture of music videos, drama, comedy and documentary. Series 3 and 4 concentrated on dealing with a different issue each week that affect young people and featured studio guests and series produced by young television producers including The House and True Tube.

Specials

There were a number of special produced for Charge including Street Crime UK – a series of short documentaries from around the UK looking at knife and gun crime, and McConville Reports following a young trainee journalist's quest to interview the leaders of Britain's leading parties.

Filming
The show was filmed at Riverwalk House in London, UK.

External links

2007 British television series debuts